Cuba Mark Gooding Jr. (born January 2, 1968) is an American actor. He is the recipient of an Academy Award, a Screen Actors Guild Award, and an Emmy nomination.

After his breakthrough role as Tre Styles in Boyz n the Hood (1991), he appeared in  A Few Good Men (1992), The Tuskegee Airmen (1995), Outbreak (1995), and Jerry Maguire (1996), for which he won the Academy Award for Best Supporting Actor.

He gained later fame for his roles in Men of Honor (2000) as Carl Brashear, and in Michael Bay's World War II epic Pearl Harbor (2001) as Doris Miller.  His other films include As Good as It Gets (1997),  What Dreams May Come (1998), Rat Race (2001), The Fighting Temptations (2003), American Gangster (2007), Gifted Hands (2009), Lee Daniels' The Butler (2013), and Selma (2014) as civil rights attorney Fred Gray. He also provided the voice of Buck the Horse in the animated feature film Home on the Range (2004).

In 2016, he portrayed O. J. Simpson in the FX drama series The People v. O. J. Simpson: American Crime Story, receiving a Primetime Emmy Award nomination for Outstanding Lead Actor in a Limited Series or Movie, and co-starred in the sixth season of the FX anthology series American Horror Story, subtitled Roanoke.

Early life
Gooding was born on January 2, 1968, in the Bronx, New York City. His mother, Shirley Sullivan, is a singer, and his father, Cuba Gooding Sr., was the lead vocalist of soul group The Main Ingredient. Gooding has three siblings: April, Omar, and Thomas. His paternal grandfather, Dudley MacDonald Gooding, was a native of Barbados. His family moved to Los Angeles in 1972 after his father's music group had their hit single "Everybody Plays the Fool"; two years later, the elder Gooding left the family. Gooding himself was raised by his mother and attended four different high schools: North Hollywood High School, Tustin High School, Apple Valley High School, and John F. Kennedy High School in Granada Hills in Los Angeles. He served as class president in three of them. He became a born-again Christian at the age of 13.

Career

Early career and major success
Gooding's first job as an entertainer was as a breakdancer, performing with singer Lionel Richie at the closing ceremonies of the 1984 Summer Olympics in Los Angeles. After high school, Gooding studied Japanese martial arts for three years, before turning his focus toward acting. Early on, he landed guest starring roles on shows like Hill Street Blues (1987), Amen (1988) and MacGyver (1988, 1989 and 1990) and also had a small part in the popular comedy Coming to America (1988). Gooding's first major role was in John Singleton's inner-city crime drama Boyz n the Hood (1991), in which he played the lead, Tre Styles. The film was a box office surprise and critical hit, and is considered a modern classic. He followed this success with supporting roles in major films such as A Few Good Men and Gladiator (1992), Judgment Night (1993), Lightning Jack (1994), and Outbreak (1995).

In 1996, Gooding reached a new level of prominence when he was cast as an arrogant yet charismatic football player in Cameron Crowe's dramatic sports comedy Jerry Maguire (1996) with co-star Tom Cruise, which was a major critical and commercial success and was nominated for the Academy Award for Best Picture and earned Gooding an Oscar for Best Supporting Actor. His exuberant "Show me the money!" line in the film became a nationwide catch phrase. His Oscar acceptance speech has often been cited for its enthusiasm.

Post-Oscar prominence

In 1997, Gooding followed his breakout with a notable supporting role in the acclaimed Academy Award-winning comedy As Good as It Gets (1997), but in the following years his career was inconsistently successful.  Some of his best received performances include turns in films such as the mystical drama What Dreams May Come (1998) and the US Naval drama Men of Honor (2000), in which he played the lead role and co-starred with Robert De Niro. 

Gooding also received attention for his roles in the epic Pearl Harbor (2001) as Doris Miller, the ensemble farce Rat Race (2001), musical dramedy The Fighting Temptations (2003), and the football drama Radio (2003), in which he played the title role. Additionally, though not well received critically, the family comedy Snow Dogs (2002) was a commercial success. 

Other roles during this time include Theo Caulder in the psychological thriller Instinct (1999) and the voice of Buck in the Disney animated film Home on the Range (2004). However, during this stage of his career, he appeared in a series of films which were not critically or commercially successful, such as Chill Factor (1999), Boat Trip (2002), Norbit (2007) and Daddy Day Camp (2007), all of which had received extremely negative reviews and, with the exception of Norbit, performed poorly at the box office.

Later career

Since then, in great contrast to earlier stages of his acting career, Gooding has appeared in many more critically ignored, direct-to-DVD films than theatrical or television releases. A well-received performance as Ben Carson in Gifted Hands: The Ben Carson Story (2009), and a small supporting role in Ridley Scott's American Gangster (2007), both proved to be exceptions to this trend. Gooding's next major film role was in the 2012 World War II film Red Tails, produced by George Lucas. 

In 2013, Gooding had roles in several theatrical release films, including a well received supporting performance in Lee Daniels's The Butler and brief appearances in Don Jon and Machete Kills. He also made his Broadway theatre debut alongside Cicely Tyson and Vanessa Williams in a Tony Award-nominated production of The Trip to Bountiful. 

In 2014, he appeared as Civil Rights Movement attorney Fred Gray in the widely acclaimed historical drama Selma. He has since appeared much more frequently on television, including performances as Samuel Fraunces in the miniseries The Book of Negroes, as a comedically embellished version of himself on Big Time in Hollywood, FL, and as O. J. Simpson in the anthology series American Crime Story: The People v. O. J. Simpson. Despite his performance receiving mixed reviews, he received a Primetime Emmy Award nomination for Outstanding Lead Actor in a Miniseries or a Movie. Gooding's Emmy nomination for his work on the series was criticized by some reviewers. In 2018, Gooding headlined the 21st Anniversary revival of the musical Chicago in the West End as Billy Flynn at the Phoenix Theatre.

His directorial debut, Bayou Caviar, was released on October 5, 2018.

Other work
In 2006, Gooding earned the Public Leadership in Neurology Award from the American Academy of Neurology for his work raising awareness about Multiple Sclerosis.

In 2012, Gooding starred in a TV pilot for Fox called Guilty that was directed by McG. Though it was well received in screenings, it was ultimately not picked up by the network. He appeared on Channel 4's Chris Moyles' Quiz Night on August 5, 2011, closing the show dueting "Bad Romance" with Lulu. In 2002, he was given a star on the Hollywood Walk of Fame. Gooding starred in an online video game called "The Quest For The Code" which focuses on juvenile asthma management.

On March 3, 2018, Gooding appeared as star guest announcer on the 100th episode of ITV's Ant and Dec's Saturday Night Takeaway.

Personal life
In 1994, Gooding married his high school sweetheart, Sara Kapfer, with whom he has three children: Spencer Gooding, Piper Gooding, and actor Mason Gooding. In 2014, Kapfer filed for legal separation from Gooding. Gooding filed for divorce in January 2017.

Legal issues and allegations of sexual misconduct

On June 13, 2019, Gooding was booked on charges of misdemeanor forcible touching and sexual abuse in the third degree in New York City relating to an incident in which he allegedly groped a woman at a bar in Times Square. On October 10, he was indicted on a separate, additional sexual abuse charge. As of August 2020, 30 women have accused Gooding of unwanted sexual touching. 

Gooding was formally charged for three incidents, each resulting in misdemeanor charges of forcible touching and third degree sexual abuse. 

On April 12, 2022, Gooding pleaded guilty to forcibly touching a woman at a New York nightclub in 2018, telling the judge he "kissed the waitress on her lips" without her consent at the LAVO New York nightclub. He also admitted to the two other alleged incidents of non-consensual contact, which took place in October 2018 and June 2019. 

The plea deal that Gooding reached with prosecutors called for no jail time, and it allowed him to withdraw his misdemeanor plea and plead to the lesser violation of harassment as long as he continued counseling for six months.

On August 19, 2020, a woman filed a lawsuit against Gooding accusing him of raping her in 2013 in New York City.

Filmography

Film

Television

Stage

Video game

References

External links

 
 
 Cinema Confidential interview (January 2002)
 Hollywood.com interview (November 9, 2000)
 Jet interview (October 11, 1999)
 Ebony interview (June 1997)
 JAM! Movies interview (December 13, 1996)
 Hanes Backstage Game with Cuba Gooding Jr. & Michael Jordan (July 2007)

1968 births
Living people
20th-century African-American people
20th-century American male actors
21st-century African-American people
21st-century American male actors
African-American Christians
African-American male actors
American evangelicals
American male film actors
American male television actors
American male voice actors
American people of Barbadian descent
Best Supporting Actor Academy Award winners
Christians from California
Christians from New York (state)
Entertainers from the Bronx
Male actors from Los Angeles
Male actors from New York City
North Hollywood High School alumni
Outstanding Performance by a Male Actor in a Supporting Role Screen Actors Guild Award winners